Highway 905 is a provincial highway in the far north region of the Canadian province of Saskatchewan. It runs from Highway 102 to Stony Rapids. A  section between Points North Landing and Black Lake is a seasonal winter road.

Route description
It goes northward and passes through the Courtenay Lake and Geikie River Recreation Sites, Wollaston Lake Barge Ferry at Hidden Bay, and the Wollaston Lake Recreation Site before coming to an intersection with a road that goes to Rabbit Lake mine and Collins Bay.

Highway 905 is an all-season, unpaved road between Black Lake and Stony Rapids.

Points North Landing serves as a permanent camp providing services for the many exploration companies searching for uranium in the area.

History
Highway 905 was originally designated as Highway 105, but was renumbered in the early 1980s as part of the establishment of the 900-series highways. In the late 1990s, the winter road between Points North Landing Black Lake was constructed, resulting Highway 964 being renumbered and Highway 905 ending at Stony Rapids.

See also 
Roads in Saskatchewan
Transportation in Saskatchewan

References 

905